Reina Hispanoamericana (Hispanic American Queen) is an annual beauty pageant celebrating Hispanic heritage, language and culture, started in 1991 as Reina Sudamericana (South American Queen), is based in Santa Cruz de la Sierra, Bolivia. Up to 2003 the participants were restricted to the 10 countries in South America; in 2004 participants from Panama and Costa Rica in Central America were invited; and in 2006 participants from the Dominican Republic, Nicaragua, Puerto Rico, Portugal & Spain joined. In 2007 Mexico, Guatemala, Honduras & United States were added, and the name changed to Reina Hispanoamericana. In 2008, Curaçao and Haiti were added. In 2017, the Philippines, Canada, and Australia were added.  

The pageant is organized by Promociones Gloria, based in Bolivia. More than 20 contestants participate every year. Of all the participating countries, only the Philippines is from Asia.

The current Reina Hispanoamericana is Andrea Bazarte of Mexico who was crowned on 30 October 2021 in Santa Cruz, Bolivia.

Titleholders

Country by winning the title

Participating Countries and Territories 
Only the countries with historical ties with Spain are allowed to compete.

US Performance

References

Notes

External links 
 Reina Hispanoamericana Official Website
 Reina Hispanoamericana 2012

 
Beauty pageants for people of specific ethnic or national descents
Beauty pageants in Bolivia
Beauty pageants
International beauty pageants
Continental beauty pageants